Benny Richard Knotts (May 23, 1951February 14, 1980) was an American ASA and NASCAR Winston Cup driver. The Paw Paw, Michigan driver began his career in 1974 and raced in various stock car series for 6 years before he died in a crash at Daytona in 1980.  Most notably, Knotts was the winner in 1979 of the Red Bud 400 at Anderson Speedway (IN), which is now regarded as one of the nation's top Super Late Model races on the short track calendar, while scoring notable ASA wins at Toledo, Anderson, and Winchester.

Death
On February 14, 1980, Knotts was in the field for the first Twin 125 race at Daytona International Speedway, hoping to qualify for that Sunday's Daytona 500. His hopes dwindled as his Weaver powered Oldsmobile quickly lost position. On the 14th lap, Knotts hit the outside wall in the short chute just past the start finish line. His car spun off the track sideways across the infield grass and struck passenger side first against the inside concrete wall entering turn one. His seat mount broke and the 28-year-old was killed instantly.

Motorsports career results

NASCAR
(key) (Bold - Pole position awarded by qualifying time. Italics - Pole position earned by points standings or practice time. * – Most laps led.)

Winston Cup Series

References

External links
 

1951 births
1980 deaths
American Speed Association drivers
Racing drivers who died while racing
People from Paw Paw, Michigan
Racing drivers from Michigan
Filmed deaths in motorsport
Sports deaths in Florida